Metawai Festival or Mentawai Charm Festival is a traditional festival/carnival held annually since 2016 at Mentawai Islands Regency, West Sumatra in Indonesia. The festival aims to promote national and international tourism to the Mentawai Islands Regency, arranged by the Indonesian Ministry of Tourism and local regency administration. The Mentawai people believe to have ancestry since 1500 BC.

Festivities 
The festival showcases traditional wedding ceremonies, traditional clothing parade, traditional tattoo demonstrations, traditional boat making, traditional archery, tribal war dance, mass dance performance, traditional bow-hunting, traditional culinary, and other traditional Mentawai culture. 

Events such as surfing are included. International surfers participate in the surfing competition.

See also
Mentawai people

References

Tourist attractions in West Sumatra
Cultural festivals in Indonesia
Carnivals in Indonesia
Annual events in Indonesia
Festivals established in 2016
2016 establishments in Indonesia
Mentawai Islands Regency